Kapadi, also known as Kapdi is a small community in Gujarat.

History

The Kapadi Sampradaya claim to be descendants of Lalu Jasraj, the guide of the Hindu deity Rama, or either claim to be descendants of Rama's army as they marched through the desert to Hinglaj.

This dress was given by Rama to one Laljusraj, who accompanied him on the trip. Laljusraj is said to be founder of Kapadi sect. It is believed that it is the same dress, that is preserved at Mekan Dada Temple at Dhrang.

They worship Ashapura Mata and make visit the Hinglaj Mata mandir in Balochistan, Pakistan.

The Kapadis consider Mekan Dada to be an incarnation of Lakshmana, the younger brother of Rama, and he visited the site of Hinglaj at the end of the 17th century. The Kapadis consider anyone who performs the pilgrimage to Hinglaj to be Kapadi as well.

See also 

 Guru-shishya tradition
 Sampradaya

References

Vaishnava sects
Ethnic groups in India
Social groups of Gujarat
Tribes of Kutch
Social groups of India
Hindu denominations
Religions that require vegetarianism